Arkesden is a village and civil parish in the Uttlesford district of Essex, England.

The Wicken Water stream flows through the village.

Arkesden is referred to as "Archesdana" in the Doomsday book of 1086, located in the ancient hundred of Uttlesford.

The parish, with its own council, is part of the parliamentary constituency of Saffron Walden, and according to the 2001 census, had a population of 363, increasing slightly to 366 at the 2011 census.

The 13th-century parish church is dedicated to St Mary the Virgin, heavily restored in 1855. The village has a village hall, on the church green, and one public house, the Axe and Compasses.

The musician Steve Marriott (of rock band Small Faces) died in a fire at his home at Arkesden in 1991.

See also
The Hundred Parishes

References

External links
 
 St Mary's Church, Arkesden, Essex Churches
 

Villages in Essex
Uttlesford